Zabernovo Bastion (‘Rid Zabernovo’ \'rid za-'ber-no-vo\) is the rounded ice-covered buttress extending 8.5 km in southeast–northwest direction and 10.5 km in southwest–northeast direction, rising to 1900 m on Davis Coast in Graham Land, Antarctica. It is situated on the northwest side of Detroit Plateau, with Topola Ridge and few smaller ridges branching from Zabernovo Bastion on the north. The feature has steep southwest, northwest and east slopes surmounting Henson Glacier and its tributary to the southwest and west, and some tributaries to Temple Glacier to the north and east.

The buttress is named after the settlement of Zabernovo in Southeastern Bulgaria.

Location
British mapping in 1978.

Maps
British Antarctic Territory. Scale 1:200000 topographic map. DOS 610 Series, Sheet W 64 60. Directorate of Overseas Surveys, Tolworth, UK, 1978.
 Antarctic Digital Database (ADD). Scale 1:250000 topographic map of Antarctica. Scientific Committee on Antarctic Research (SCAR), 1993–2016.

Notes

References
 Bulgarian Antarctic Gazetteer. Antarctic Place-names Commission. (details in Bulgarian, basic data in English)
 Zabernovo Bastion. SCAR Composite Antarctic Gazetteer

External links
 Zabernovo Bastion. Copernix satellite image

Mountains of Graham Land
Davis Coast
Bulgaria and the Antarctic